The Belgium national handball team is the national team of Belgium. It is governed by the Royal Belgian Handball Federation and takes part in international handball competitions.

World Championship record
2023 – 21st place

Current squad
Squad for the 2023 World Men's Handball Championship.

Head coach: Yérime Sylla

References

External links
IHF profile

Men's national handball teams
Handball